Lymphangitis carcinomatosa is inflammation of the lymph vessels (lymphangitis) caused by a malignancy.  Breast, lung, stomach, pancreas, and prostate cancers are the most common tumors that result in lymphangitis. Lymphangitis carcinomatosa was first described by pathologist Gabriel Andral in 1829 in a patient with uterine cancer. Lymphangitis carcinomatosa may show the presence of Kerley B lines on chest X-ray.

Lymphangitis carcinomatosa most often affects people 40–49 years of age.

Lymphangitis carcinomatosa may be caused by the following malignancies as suggested by the mnemonic: "Certain Cancers Spread By Plugging The Lymphatics" (cervical cancer, colon cancer, stomach cancer, breast cancer/bronchiogenic carcinoma, pancreatic cancer, thyroid cancer, laryngeal cancer)

Pathology
In most cases, lymphangitis carcinomatosis is caused by the dissemination of a tumor with its cells along the lymphatics.  However, in about 20 percent of cases, the inflammation of the lymphatic tubules (lymphangitis) is caused by a tumor that blocks the drainage of the lymph duct. In the lung, this is often caused by a centrally located mass, near the hilum of the lung that blocks lymphatic drainage.

Prognosis
Previously, the finding of lymphangitis carcinomatosis meant about a six-month life expectancy.  However, improved treatment has improved survival in patients with lymphangitis carcinomatosis, with patients often surviving three or more years with treatment.

History
Lymphangitis carcinomatosa was first described by pathologist Gabriel Andral in 1829 in a patient with uterine cancer.

See also
 Lymphangitis

References

External links 

Paraneoplastic syndromes
Medical mnemonics